Parliamentary elections were held in Austria on 7 October 1990. The Social Democratic Party won the most seats, and retained the grand coalition with the Austrian People's Party. Voter turnout was 86%.

Results

References

Elections in Austria
Legislative
Austria
Austria